Walter Arencibia Rodríguez (born July 21, 1967) is a Cuban chess grandmaster. 

He learned chess at the age of eight and has won various tournaments, including the 1986 World Junior Chess Championship, for which he automatically gained the International Master title. Also in 1986, Rodríguez won the Pan American Junior Chess Championship. He was awarded the title of Grandmaster in 1990. Other tournament victories include the Cuban Youth Championships in 1985, and equal first in the Canadian Open Chess Championship in 2006 and 2011. He has represented Cuba in nine Chess Olympiads from 1986 to 2006.

References

External links
Walter Arencibia's official website

Walter Arencibia chess games at 365Chess.com

1967 births
Living people
Chess grandmasters
Cuban chess players
World Junior Chess Champions
Chess Olympiad competitors
Place of birth missing (living people)